The Shahid Ejei High School (Persian : دبیرستان شهید اژه ای), Ejei high school or Ezhei high school is located in University of Isfahan, Isfahan, Iran.

As a part of National Organization for Development of Exceptional Talents (NODET), Shahid Ejei high school is the top rank high school in the province and one of the best in Iran.
The high school includes a Pre-University School and it is next to the Shahid Ejei Middle School (Persian : راهنمایی شهید اژه ای) .

The students are selected mostly from Ejei Middle School and some other students from outside NODET organization schools through a competitive entrance exam.

Courses are deep and college-level in math & sciences and regular in humanities (except for English). There are three majors offered, math-physics, experimental sciences and humanities. Passing grade for courses is 12, rather than 10 (normal high schools) & the average mark should be 14 or more.
The school has the most competitive faculty in the province and one of the best in the country.
All students are reported to attend 4-year universities or 7-year medical schools.

History 
(Shahid) Ejei guidance school or Shahid Ejei Middle School was formed in 1988 from which the Ejei high school was later derived in 1990.

See also 
 Education in Iran
 National Organization for Development of Exceptional Talents
 Ejei Middle School
 Tehran's Allame Helli 3 High School

References 

 http://wikimapia.org/1380207/Shahid-Ejei-School%D9%8F
 National Organization for Development of Exceptional Talents
 Sampadia's (nodet students) Official Website
 SampadClub

External links
 Shahid Ejei High School Official Website
 Sampadia's (nodet students) Official Website
 National Organization for Development of Exceptional Talents
 Stunedt's forum
 social Community of ejei 1 high school
 ejei 1 high school website
 SampadClub

Selective schools
Schools in Isfahan
High schools in Iran